The 1972 NBA World Championship Series was the championship round played at the conclusion of the 1971–72 National Basketball Association (NBA) season. The Western Conference champion Los Angeles Lakers defeated the Eastern Conference champion New York Knicks in five games to win their sixth title. The Lakers got their first NBA championship since the franchise moved to Los Angeles from Minneapolis, Minnesota. It was a rematch of the 1970 NBA Finals that the Knicks had won in a full seven-game series.

This season's team won a then NBA-record 69 regular season games, including 33 wins in a row -- a record which still stands. The 69 wins would remain a record for the most wins in a season until the 1995–96 Chicago Bulls (who were coached by former Knicks player Phil Jackson) broke it in route to a 72-win season that also resulted in a championship of their own.

They were led by Wilt Chamberlain, the NBA's top rebounder that season. Guards Gail Goodrich and Jerry West were each among the NBA's top ten scorers that season, spearheading the NBA's top offense at 121 points per game. West also led the NBA in assists. The Lakers as a team led all NBA teams in rebounds and assists that season.

Los Angeles had swept a solid 57-win Chicago Bulls team in the playoffs' opening round, then defeated the defending champion Milwaukee Bucks (record of 63–19) in six games to win the Western Conference. That historic series had matched Chamberlain against Kareem Abdul-Jabbar, and West against Oscar Robertson. Having defeated tough Milwaukee, 48-win New York figured to be an easy formality for the Lakers.

New York was a top defensive team that allowed just 98.2 points per game and made 47% of their shots as a team. They had defeated the 38-win Baltimore Bullets and then upset the 56-win Boston Celtics to win the Eastern Conference final.

This was the first of 23 consecutive championship series officiated by Jake O'Donnell. In the previous three seasons, O'Donnell could not work the playoffs due to his duties as an American League umpire. He resigned from umpiring after working the 1971 American League Championship Series to become a full-time NBA official, working through the second round of the 1995 playoffs.

Series summary 

Lakers win series 4–1

Game-by-game summary

Game 1

Willis Reed was out with a knee injury, but his replacement, Jerry Lucas, scored 26 points on 13 of 21 shooting to lead the Knicks to the win in the series opener. Lucas, a 6'9" center, was an excellent outside shooter. Chamberlain would not pursue him far from the basket and preferred to position for rebounds instead. The intelligent Lucas exploited this fact.
But Lucas was not the only Knick who was red hot. Bill Bradley hit 11 of 12 shots from the field as New York shot 53 percent as a team for the game. The team took advantage of a nearly perfect first half to jump to a good lead and won easily, 114-92. New York hit 16 of their first 20 shots and led after each quarter. The win was considered a surprising upset.
Dave DeBusschere added 19 points and 18 rebounds. Walt Frazier triple-doubled with 14 points, 11 assists and 12 rebounds.
The high-scoring Lakers backcourt of Jerry West and Gail Goodrich shot a cold 11 of 37, and no Los Angeles players took up their slack.

Game 2

Heavily criticized for their Game 1 loss in the home opener, the Lakers looked to avenge themselves on their home court again. But at halftime, the Lakers' lead was just 51-50.
Knicks forward DeBusschere, straining in position battles against the gigantic Chamberlain, hurt his side and did not play after the first half. The loss of DeBusschere, a key New York rebounder and defender, would badly hurt the team's chances from this point forward. He had played 43 minutes in Game 1, and the Knicks relied on him heavily.
Also playing hurt was New York guard Earl Monroe. The Lakers' Gail Goodrich took advantage and netted 31 points. The still cold-shooting West simply passed and had 13 assists.
Chamberlain took advantage of DeBusschere's absence and pulled down 24 rebounds, controlling the middle at both ends of the court.
Lucas had foul trouble and sat much of the third quarter, with New York scoring just 11 points in the period. A New York rally in the fourth quarter could not stop a 106-92 Los Angeles win to even the series.

Both teams used short rotations during the series. Los Angeles played each of its starters 40 minutes or more in Game 2, with Chamberlain playing all 48. New York figured to do the same, but now had to deal with injury issues to DeBusschere and Monroe.

Game 3

Despite injury issues, New York fans were optimistic as the series now headed to Madison Square Garden, where the Knicks went 5-0 vs. the Bullets and Celtics in route to the Finals. The Knicks had gotten their ' split ' in two games in Los Angeles, and now had a chance to take control of the series.
DeBusschere gamely attempted to play in the first half, but simply could not overcome his injury. He missed all six of his field-goal attempts. He was hurting and elected not to play in the second half. DeBusschere explained: "I didn't feel I was helping the team".
Lucas, the star of Game 1, tried to take up DeBusschere's slack. He hit 11 of 21 shots for 23 total points and 14 rebounds in 47 minutes of play. He also added a team-high six assists.
Frazier added 25 points himself. Bradley went a cold 5 of 17.
The Lakers led 52-47 at the half, and with DeBusschere out, took over the game again in the third quarter. Chamberlain and Laker forward Happy Hairston collected 20 rebounds apiece, with the Laker giant also adding 26 points on 9 of 10 shooting. West and Goodrich combined for 46 points, and Los Angeles danced out to a 22-point lead and took a 2-1 lead in the series with a 107-96 win.
Nineteen thousand five-hundred New York fans watched the contest.

Game 4

The Knicks felt that Game 4 was a must-win game. DeBusschere vowed to play, lasting 48 minutes and pulling down a team-high 13 rebounds. New York led 56-53 at the half. After an even third quarter, the Lakers rallied in the fourth. West made a clutch basket to give the Lakers the lead with seconds left, but a Frazier tip-in over Chamberlain evened the score. West missed at the buzzer, sending the game into overtime tied 101-101. The Lakers would outscore New York 15-10 in the extra frame to win 116-111 and take a commanding 3-1 series lead back to Los Angeles.

All five Los Angeles starters played at least 45 minutes in Game 4, with Lakers coach Bill Sharman using just seven players total. Chamberlain played all 53 minutes and had 24 rebounds. The Laker starting guards combined for 56 points to again key the team.

In the game New York had two players that played at least 50 minutes. Lucas played all 53 minutes, and had 25 points on 11-22 shooting, with 11 assists and eight rebounds. Frazier had 24 points, eight rebounds and eight assists in 50 minutes.

Game 5

The Lakers returned home looking to win their first title in Los Angeles. After playing to a 53-all tie at halftime, The Lakers finally pulled away from the tired Knicks in the second half.

Chamberlain dominated the middle, flirting with what would've been a quadruple-double with 24 points, 29 rebounds, eight blocks and eight assists in 47 minutes. Blocked shots were not an official NBA stat at that time, but ABC announcer Keith Jackson counted them up during the broadcast. West and Goodrich combined for 48 points.

Walt Frazier had 27 points, 10 assists, and seven rebounds in 47 minutes for the Knicks.

The Lakers won 114-100 to claim their first NBA Championship in Los Angeles. For the series, Chamberlain averaged 19.4 points and 23.2 rebounds and was named Finals Most Valuable Player.

West had averaged 19.8 points and 8.8 assists, and Goodrich averaged 25.2 points for the series.

Aftermath
The teams would meet again in the finals the following year, as the Knicks would get their revenge. In a reversal of the 1972 series, the Knicks would win four in a row after losing the opener to win their second NBA title in four years.

Team rosters

Los Angeles Lakers

New York Knicks

See also
 1971-72 NBA season
 1972 NBA Playoffs

References

External links
New York Times (April 25, 1972) Pre-Game 1: "Wilt Feels Short Series Is Sweetest Way to Win"
New York Times (April 26, 1972) Pre-Game 1: "Knicks and Lakers… Then and Now: Astonishing Differences in 2 Years"
New York Times (April 27, 1972) Game 1: "Happy Knicks ‘Cautious’ As Lakers Seem in Shock"
New York Times (April 28, 1972) Game 1: "Lakers Still Can't Believe What Knicks Did to Them"
New York Times (April 29, 1972) Pre-Game 2: "Speaking of Willis Reed, Well…"
New York Times (April 29, 1972) Pre-Game 2: "Goliath Is Now David With A Slingshot"
New York Times (April 30, 1972) Pre-Game 2: "Knicks Expecting Changes"
New York Times (April 30, 1972) Pre-Game 2: "Knicks Play It The Smart Way"
New York Times (May 1, 1972) Game 2: "Rangers and Knicks Lose"
New York Times (May 1, 1972) Pre-Game 3: "Fast Return to Line‐up Vowed by DeBusschere"
New York Times (May 2, 1972) Pre-Game 3: "DOUBTFUL STATUS FOR DEBUSSCHERE"
New York Times (May 4, 1972) Game 3: "Lakers Beat Knicks, 107‐96, and Lead Final, 2‐1"
New York Times (May 6, 1972) Game 4: "Lakers Beat Knicks, 116‐111, for 3‐1 Lead"
New York Times (May 7, 1972) Pre-Game 5: "REPORT OF INJURY LIFTS KNICK HOPES; Doctor Doubts Chamberlain Can Play for the Lakers Tonight in Fifth Game"
New York Times (May 8, 1972) Game 5: "Lakers Beat Knicks, 114‐100, Win Crown"
New York Times (May 9, 1972) Game 5: "Wilt's Crowning Touches for Lakers"
 NBA History Summary of Series
 Box Scores & Series Stats
 Sports Illustrated (May 15, 1972) Los Angeles Champions at Last!
 Wilt: Larger Than Life (p. 252-270)

National Basketball Association Finals
NBA
NBA
Finals
NBA Finals
1970s in Los Angeles County, California
Basketball competitions in New York City
Basketball competitions in Inglewood, California
NBA Finals
NBA Finals
NBA Finals